Lothar de Maizière (born 2 March 1940) is a German Christian Democratic politician.  In 1990, he served as the only premier of the German Democratic Republic to be democratically elected freely and fairly by the people. He was also the last leader of an independent East Germany.

Family background
Maizière belongs to a noble family which takes its name from Maizières-lès-Metz who, as Huguenots, fled France for asylum in Prussia in the late 17th century; the Maizière family attended French-language schools and Huguenot churches in Berlin until the beginning of the 20th century. He is a son of the lawyer Clement de Maizière. His uncle Ulrich de Maizière was Inspector General of the Bundeswehr (the West German Armed Forces). His cousin Thomas de Maizière was a close advisor to Former Chancellor Angela Merkel and served as the Federal Minister of the Interior from 17 December 2013 to 14 March 2018 in Merkel's third cabinet.

Early life and education
Lothar de Maizière was born in Nordhausen, Thuringia, and attended the ancient Berlinisches Gymnasium zum Grauen Kloster, where he was one of the last pupils before the school closed in 1958. He next studied viola at the Hanns Eisler College of Music in East Berlin from 1959 to 1965.  He played in the Berlin Symphony Orchestra before going on to study law (by distance learning, through the Humboldt-Universität zu Berlin) from 1969 to 1975.

Career
A longtime member of the East German Christian Democratic Union, Maizière helped oust the party's pro-Communist leadership after the fall of the Berlin Wall.  He was elected the party's chairman in November 1989. In the first—and as it turned out, only—free election held in East Germany, Maizière was elected to the Volkskammer.  One month later, he succeeded Hans Modrow as Premier and held this position from 12 April until 2 October 1990, heading the de Maizière cabinet.  He ran on a platform of speedy reunification with the Federal Republic of Germany (from 1949 to 1990, West Germany).  As premier, Maizière signed the Treaty on the Final Settlement with Respect to Germany (the so-called "Two Plus Four Treaty"), which ended the four wartime allied powers' rights and responsibilities in Berlin and Germany, and which preceded German reunification.  The treaty provided that it would be signed by the four allies and the two Germanies but ratified only by newly reunified Germany and the allies.  In accordance with that treaty, East Germany ceased to exist on 3 October, and its territory was annexed by the Federal Republic.

After German reunification, he was appointed Minister for Special Affairs in the CDU government of chancellor Helmut Kohl, until his resignation on 17 December 1990 amid rumours that he had worked for the East German Stasi (Stasi name: IM Czerni).

References

External links

1940 births
Living people
German untitled nobility
People from Nordhausen, Thuringia
Lothar
Leaders of East Germany
Christian Democratic Union (East Germany) politicians
Christian Democratic Union of Germany politicians
Members of the 10th Volkskammer
Foreign Ministers of East Germany
Prime Ministers of East Germany
Humboldt University of Berlin alumni
Members of the Bundestag for Berlin
Members of the Bundestag for Brandenburg
People of the Stasi